The 1957–58 NBA season was the Nationals' 9th season in the NBA.

Regular season

Season standings

x – clinched playoff spot

Record vs. opponents

Game log

Playoffs

|- align="center" bgcolor="#ccffcc" 
| 1
| March 15
| Philadelphia
| W 86–82
| Dolph Schayes (22)
| Red Kerr (22)
| Schayes, Costello (4)
| Onondaga War Memorial
| 1–0
|- align="center" bgcolor="#ffcccc" 
| 2
| March 16
| @ Philadelphia
| L 93–95
| Dolph Schayes (32)
| Red Kerr (20)
| Paul Seymour (4)
| Philadelphia Civic Center
| 1–1
|- align="center" bgcolor="#ffcccc" 
| 3
| March 18
| Philadelphia
| L 88–101
| Dolph Schayes (26)
| Red Kerr (19)
| Larry Costello (7)
| Onondaga War Memorial
| 1–2
|-

Awards and records
Dolph Schayes, All-NBA First Team

References

Philadelphia 76ers seasons
Syracuse